Micropostega aeneofasciata is a moth in the  family Lyonetiidae. It is known from Gambia.

References

Lyonetiidae
Moths described in 1891
Moths of Africa